The following is a list of Roman Catholic churches in Port Harcourt, Nigeria.

The Diocese of Port Harcourt covers the city of Port Harcourt.

Diocese of Port Harcourt

See also
Bishop of Port Harcourt
List of Roman Catholic cathedrals in Nigeria
List of Roman Catholic dioceses in Nigeria
Roman Catholicism in Nigeria

References

External links

Churches, Roman Catholic
Port Harcourt
List, Port Harcourt
List
Lists of religious buildings and structures in Nigeria
Port Harcourt